The 1964 Paris–Tours was the 58th edition of the Paris–Tours cycle race and was held on 11 October 1964. The race started in Paris and finished in Tours. The race was won by Guido Reybrouck.

General classification

References

1964 in French sport
1964
1964 Super Prestige Pernod
October 1964 sports events in Europe